Lauren Mote (born 10 February 1997) is a British actress who is best known for voice-acting roles such as Lizzy in the 2010 Disney animated film Tinker Bell and the Great Fairy Rescue. In her teens, she switched to a focus on voicing characters in video games, and has also appeared in various BBC Radio 4 drama productions, as well as some live-acting television and stage performances.

Early life 
Mote was born in Sunderland on 10th February 1997. She trained at her local Stagecoach Theatre Arts School from the age of five. Mote and her family moved to London in 2007, after she was accepted into the Sylvia Young Theatre School.

Career 
Mote won the leading role of Lizzy in Tinker Bell and the Great Fairy Rescue, part of an animated Disney series featuring Tinker Bell the fairy from Peter Pan, following an open audition in 2008.

Other work completed by Mote includes the 2009 BBC Radio 4 serial of Matilda, based on the novel by Roald Dahl, in which she voiced the leading role of five-year-old Matilda. She also starred in the BBC Radio 4 Afternoon Play Highgate Letters, broadcast in April 2010, and performed in the musical Oliver! at the Theatre Royal, Drury Lane, in London's West End, in 2008 and 2009. In 2011, Mote took the lead role of Harmony Parker in the BBC Radio 4 Extra dramatisation of The Queen's Nose and the lead role of Alice in the BBC Radio 4 adaptation of Alice Through the Looking Glass. She portrayed the role of Lizanne in the first two episodes of the third series of Tracy Beaker Returns.

Mote voiced the characters of Esther and Myrtle in the 2013 English Language release of Level 5 and Studio Ghibli's Ni no Kuni: Wrath of the White Witch.

Filmography

References

External links
 

English film actresses
English radio actresses
1997 births
Living people
English child actresses
People from Sunderland
Actresses from Tyne and Wear
English voice actresses
English musical theatre actresses